You Be Me is an album by the American jazz guitarist Joe Morris, recorded in 1995 and released on the Italian Soul Note label. For the record, Morris expanded to a quartet consisting of the trio with whom he recorded Symbolic Gesture, with the addition of violinist Mat Maneri.

Reception

In an article for the Boston Phoenix, Ed Hazell noted that the group possessed "flexible interconnections that stretch and bend but never break. They hold most tightly together at precisely those moments it seems they must fly apart. This sense of communion comes from more than craft; its origins lie in a fundamental spirituality at the heart of music in the African-American tradition."

The JazzTimes review by Harvey Pekar states: "The quartet does some good pointillistic work, illustrating their ability to listen and defer to each other."

Track listing
All compositions by Joe Morris
 "You Be Me" – 11:47
 "Deep Discount" – 7:16 
 "Transmitter" – 6:27 
 "The Object of Color" – 11:48
 "Real Reason" – 12:05 
 "Adult Themes" – 10:11
 "Glider" – 6:05

Personnel
Joe Morris - guitar
Mat Maneri – violin 
 Nate McBride – bass
 Curt Newton – drums

References

1997 albums
Joe Morris (guitarist) albums
Black Saint/Soul Note albums